Karl Wach (7 January 1878 – 21 June 1952) was a German architect. His work was part of the architecture event in the art competition at the 1936 Summer Olympics.

References

1878 births
1952 deaths
20th-century German architects
Olympic competitors in art competitions
Architects from Frankfurt